The Union Trust Building is a nine-story office building, located at 740 15th Street, Northwest, Washington, D.C. It was constructed for the Union Trust Company between 1906 and 1907. The building is listed on the National Register of Historic Places, and is a contributing property to the 15th Street Financial Historic District. It sits on the location of Wormley's Hotel, owned by James Wormley, a free-born black man, where the Wormley Agreement was penned, which led to the Compromise of 1877 and the election of President Rutherford B. Hayes. It has been substantially expanded twice, first in 1927 and then converted to a modern office building in 1983.

Union Trust was a trust bank founded in 1899 as the Union Trust and Storage Company by a group of investors led by George Hamilton and Edward J. Stellwagen. Stellwagen was the president of the Thomas J. Fisher Companies, a real estate and mortgage brokerage closely affiliated with Senator Francis G. Newlands, and the company was in part organized to act as the fiduciary for investment by Williams Deacon's Bank to the Chevy Chase Land Company, one of the investments Newlands managed on behalf of his the descendants of his father-in-law, William Sharon. As was common at the time, the distinction between Union Trust, the Chevy Chase Land Company, and the Fisher Companies was blurred. During its early years, the Fisher Companies' brokerage office was located off a separate door at the south end of the building, and the Land Company kept offices as a tenant above.

Union Trust, after several mergers, became First American Bancorp before being purchased by First Union Bank.

Tenants have included the American Planning and Civic Association and Covington & Burling, which had its offices in the Old Union Trust Building in 1940, when Gerhard Gesell joined the firm (according to his 1984 unpublished memoir). The site is now home to the New America Foundation.

Construction
In 1906 Waddy Butler Wood of Wood, Donn & Deming became the first Washington, D.C. architectural firm to design a bank high-rise in their city when they designed the Union Trust Building. In the past, the city's largest banks had each retained nationally renowned architects while local architects were only chosen to design bank branches or remodel existing buildings. By choosing Wood's firm, Union Trust began a trend of the city's banks choosing local architects to design their buildings. The building is faced in Mount Airy granite, with bronze and glass details.

First American Bancorp hired Keyes Condon Florance to renovate the building between 1980 and 1983, modernizing the building and reconfiguring the building from the second level up.

See also
National Register of Historic Places listings in Washington, D.C.

References

External links

http://www.ebay.com/itm/1920-Vintage-Ad-WASHINGTON-DC-Union-Trust-Building-PHOT-/310120436234
https://www.flickr.com/photos/wallyg/5183588172/
http://wikimapia.org/13612997/Union-Trust-Building

Commercial buildings on the National Register of Historic Places in Washington, D.C.
Neoclassical architecture in Washington, D.C.
Commercial buildings completed in 1907
Skyscraper office buildings in Washington, D.C.
1907 establishments in Washington, D.C.